Moura is the sixth album released by fado singer Ana Moura. It was released in November 2015 by Mercury Records and Universal Music Portugal. The album peaked at No. 1 on the Associação Fonográfica Portuguesa chart.

Track listing
 "Moura Encantada" (Manuela De Freitas, Alfredo Marceneiro) [4:44]
 "Fado Dançado" (Miguel Araújo) [2:17]
 "Desamparo" (Márcia Santos) [3:37] 
 "Dia De Folga" (Jorge Cruz) [2:39]
 "Lilac Wine" (James Shelton) [4:17]
 "Ai Eu" (Luís José Martins, Pedro Da Silva Martins) [4:38]
 "Eu Entrego" (Edu Mundo) [2:46]
 "Agora É Que É" (Pedro Abrunhosa [3:11]
 "Cantiga De Abrigo" (Samuel Úria) [3:55]
 "O Meu Amor Foi Para O Brasil" (Carlos Tê) [2:52]
 "Ninharia" (Fado Carlos Da Maia, Maria Do Rosário Pedreira) [4:18]
 "Tens Os Olhos De Deus" (Pedro Abrunhosa) [5:19]
 "Não Quero Nem Saber" (Kalaf Epalanga, Sara Tavares) [3:06]
 "Moura" (José Eduardo Agualusa, Toty Sa'med) [4:16]

References

2015 albums
Albums produced by Larry Klein
Ana Moura albums
Portuguese-language albums
Universal Music Portugal albums